Granite Village, Nova Scotia  is a community of the Municipality of the District of Shelburne in the Canadian province of Nova Scotia.

References
 Granite Village on Destination Nova Scotia
 Granite Village Webcam Nova Scotia  Transportation and Infrastructure Renewal

Communities in Shelburne County, Nova Scotia
General Service Areas in Nova Scotia